Anton Chirlacopschi (born 24 May 1942) is a Romanian rower. He competed in the men's coxless four event at the 1968 Summer Olympics.

References

1942 births
Living people
Romanian male rowers
Olympic rowers of Romania
Rowers at the 1968 Summer Olympics
Sportspeople from Brăila